H Story is a 2001 Japanese drama film by writer-director Nobuhiro Suwa. It was screened in the Un Certain Regard section at the 2001 Cannes Film Festival. It is an autobiographical docufiction about an attempt to remake Alain Resnais' 1959 film Hiroshima Mon Amour.

Cast
 Béatrice Dalle as The actress
 Kou Machida as The writer
 Hiroaki Umano as The actor
 Nobuhiro Suwa as himself
 Caroline Champetier as herself
 Michiko Yoshitake as herself
 Motoko Suhama as herself

References

External links

2001 films
2000s Japanese-language films
2001 drama films
Films directed by Nobuhiro Suwa
Films about the atomic bombings of Hiroshima and Nagasaki
Films set in Hiroshima
Films shot in Hiroshima
2000s Japanese films